Gautama Maharishi, was a sage in Hinduism, who is also mentioned in Jainism and Buddhism. Gautama is mentioned in the Yajurveda, Ramayana, and Gaṇeśa Pūrana and is known for cursing his wife Ahalyā. Another important story related to Gautama is about the creation of river Godavari, which is also known as Gautami.

Children
According to Valmiki Ramayana, Gautama's eldest son with Ahalyā is Satananda. But according to Adi Parva of Mahabharata, he had two sons named Saradvan and Cirakari. Saradvan was also known as Gautama, hence his children Kripa and Kripi were called Gautama and Gautami respectively. A daughter of Gautama is referred too but her name is never disclosed in the epic. In Sabha Parva, he begets many children through Aushinara (daughter of Uśīnara), amongst whom eldest in Kakshivat. Gautama and Aushinara's marriage takes place at Magadha, the kingdom of Jarasandha. According to Vamana Purana, he had three daughters named Jaya, Jayanti and Aparajita. 

Gautama is also have said to have fathered Śvetaketu with Uddālaka Āruṇi in the Bṛhadāraṇyaka Upaniṣad.

Ahalyā's curse

The Gaṇeśa Purāṇa and Ramayana describes Ahalyā as his wife. Their marriage is recorded in the Uttara Khaṇḍa, which is believed as an interpolation to the epic. As per the story Brahma, the creator god, creates a beautiful girl and gifts her as a bride to Gautama and a son named Shatananda is born. 

The Upāsanā Khaṇḍa mentions Gautama cursing Indra when he comes home and finds Indra in an argument with his wife. It is revealed that she had sex with Indra disguised as Gautama and he curses Indra with 1000 vaginas and turns Ahalyā into a stone until Rāma steps on her. Indra is eventually returned to normal after Gautama recites a mantra, and finds greatness in Gaṇeśa that he reveals to the Devas. and Ahalyā is graced by Rāma's foot. 

The Bala Khaṇḍa mentions that Gautama spots Indra, who is still in disguise, and curses him to lose his testicles. Gautama then returns to his ashram and accepts her.

Upaniṣads 

Gautama is mentioned in two tales inside Bṛhadāraṇyaka Upaniṣad. He speaks to Yajñavalkya with Uddālaka Āruṇi, Gārgī Vāchaknavī and other Kuru and Pañcāla sages in King Janaka's kingdom to test to see if Yajñavalkya is a great sage.

He also has a conversation with Pravāhaṇa Jaivali after Jaivali meets Śvetaketu and requests to meet his father. 
Jaivali promises to grant Gautama a boon, and describes the beauty and depth of the physical world, and teaches him how to perform yajña.

Inside the Kṛṣṇa (black) book of the Yajurveda there is brief mention of Gautama in the Brahmavidya Upaniṣad where a sage suggests killing Gautama instead of him in a conversation regarding androphilic intercourse and attractions.

References

External links

Rishis
Characters in the Ramayana
Saptarishi